Peter Almqvist (17 July 1957 – April 2015) was a Swedish jazz guitarist who started the duo Guitars Unlimited with Ulf Wakenius.

Career
Almqvist started playing guitar after hearing the Beatles. His introduction to jazz came from his father's record collection. A native of Sweden, he took lessons in London from guitarist Ike Isaacs.

Almqvist and guitarist Ulf Wakenius founded the acoustic jazz duo Guitars Unlimited. From 1982–'83, Almqvist worked with violinist Svend Asmussen. In the 1990s, he started a trio that toured with Art Farmer and made an album with pianist Horace Parlan.

Almqvist died at the age of 57 in early April 2015 during Easter weekend.

Discography
 Dig Myself & I (Storyville, 1995)
 With Horace Parlan (Storyville, 1997)
 My Sound: Solos and Duets (Storyville, 2001)

References 

Swedish guitarists
Male guitarists
1957 births
2015 deaths
Swedish male musicians